Menzy Coco (born December 22, 1989) is a Mauritian footballer who currently plays for Curepipe Starlight in the Mauritian League as a midfielder.

Career

Senior career
Coco started off his professional career in 2010 with ASPL 2000.

International career
Coco earned his first cap for Mauritius in October 2010 in an AFCON qualifying match against Senegal. His second cap came in March 2011, in another AFCON qualifier, against DR Congo.

References

External links

Living people
1989 births
Mauritian footballers
Mauritius international footballers
AS Port-Louis 2000 players
Mauritian Premier League players
Curepipe Starlight SC players
Association football midfielders